Roland Adelbert Spitzer (September 21, 1885 – May 20, 1916) was an American middle-distance runner. He competed in the men's 3200 metres steeplechase at the 1908 Summer Olympics.
Spitzer was the son of A.L. Spitzer, a millionaire from Toledo, Ohio. He attended Yale University where he achieved prominence as a runner and served as captain of the cross-country team. He was a member of the United States Olympic team in 1908 and graduated from Yale in 1909. He then served as the treasurer of the Spitzer Building Company. He developed a "stomach ailment" for which he sought treatment by the Mayo Brothers in Rochester, Minnesota. He died in 1916 at age 31.

References

External links
 

1885 births
1916 deaths
Athletes (track and field) at the 1908 Summer Olympics
American male middle-distance runners
American male steeplechase runners
Olympic track and field athletes of the United States
Place of birth missing